Pediatric Pulmonology is a monthly peer-reviewed medical journal covering pediatric pulmonology. It was established in 1985; the editor-in-chief is Susanna McColley, MD. According to the Journal Citation Reports, the journal has a 2020 impact factor of 3.039, ranking it 36th out of 129 journals in the category "Pediatrics" and 36th out of 64 in the category "Respiratory System".

References

External links

Pediatrics journals
Pulmonology journals
Wiley (publisher) academic journals
Publications established in 1985
Monthly journals
English-language journals